Witman Hung partygate refers to a political scandal in Hong Kong that occurred during the COVID-19 pandemic. A banquet was held at a tapas bar in Wan Chai on 3 January 2022, during the fifth wave of COVID-19 pandemic, to celebrate the 53rd birthday of Witman Hung Wai-man, a delegate of Hong Kong to the National People's Congress. Amidst initial spread of the Omicron variant, the event was attended by at least 225 people, including fourteen senior officials and twenty lawmakers, exceeding the legal capacity of the venue. The party was held against advice given by authorities to avoid large gatherings, and some attendees were later scrutinised for failing to scan the LeaveHomeSafe contact tracing app, as was legally required.

The party became known to the public after a participant became infected with COVID-19, prompting authorities to order Hung and 170 other attendees to enter quarantine at a state facility in Penny's Bay. The event became a political scandal over possible violation of anti-epidemic regulations, while government officials joining the private party were criticised for malfeasance in office. Chief Executive Carrie Lam suspended 13 officials who had attended, including Secretary for Home Affairs Caspar Tsui, who later resigned his post.

Background 
During the COVID-19 pandemic, Hong Kong authorities have maintained strict public health measures and implemented a zero-COVID policy. The first clusters of the highly contagious Omicron variant of concern appeared in the city on 30 December. In response, authorities advised citizens to avoid crowds or attending large gatherings.

Witman Hung Wai-man is the principal liaison officer for Hong Kong at the Shenzhen Qianhai Authority and a delegate of Hong Kong to the National People's Congress. Described by South China Morning Post as a "flamboyant personality" Hung is considered well connected among Hong Kong political and business leaders. An anonymous source familiar with Hung also described him as a "".

The 7th Legislative Council of Hong Kong had just been formed after the 2021 legislative election, and was due to convene its first session on 12 January 2022, just days before the scandal broke and implicated several newly elected members.

Witman Hung's birthday party 
On 3 January 2022, a banquet was held to celebrate the 53rd birthday of Witman Hung Wai-man at Reserva Ibérica Tapas Bar & Restaurant in Causeway Centre, Wan Chai. With an indoor dining area of about 1,000 square feet, the restaurant was estimated to be serving 150 customers under the "type D" mode of operation. The number of diners in type D catering businesses could not exceed the seating capacity of the premise and it was the restaurant's responsibility under the law to ensure that all customers had scanned the QR code for the government's track-and-trace mobile application before entering the venue.

However, photographs leaked to the press showed more than 200 joined the crowded party, with some believed to be senior government officials and members of the Legislative Council, who had attended their oath-taking ceremony earlier that day. Hung was photographed not wearing a mask while singing karaoke and interacting closely with guests. Reports suggested that some officials, including Secretary for Home Affairs Caspar Tsui, stayed throughout the banquet, while some others attended for brief periods before leaving.

Consequences 

On 6 January, a participant of the party, who had been in close contact with some legislators, tested positive for COVID-19. Chief Executive Carrie Lam later that day confirmed more than ten officials joined the party. She said she was "very disappointed" in ministers joining the party, especially Tsui, and vowed to take action.

The Food and Environmental Hygiene Department launched an investigation into social distancing adherence at the restaurant during the event on 7 January, whilst Lam announced Director of the Chief Executive's Office Eric Chan Kwok-ki and Secretary for the Civil Service Patrick Nip Tak-kuen would be tasked with parallel investigations into the actions of attending legislators.

In accordance with Hong Kong's COVID-19 contact tracing system, 170 attendees including 20 legislators and more than 10 government officials were ordered to enter a 21-day quarantine at a state facility in Penny's Bay. Lam suspended 13 officials for the duration of their quarantine. A second attendee later tested positive for the virus although this was later found to be a false positive, leading to 11 officials being permitted to leave the quarantine facility; Lam instead ordered them to self-isolate at home using their own annual leave.

On 18 January, three officials including Tsui left the quarantine facility early as the 21-day isolation period had been reduced to 14 days.

Notable attendees

Government officials
Principal officials

Caspar Tsui@*, Secretary for Home Affairs
Christopher Hui#, Secretary for Financial Services and the Treasury
Simon Peh#, Commissioner of the Independent Commission Against Corruption

Raymond Siu#, Commissioner of Police
Au Ka-wang@*, Director of Immigration

Political appointees

Jack Chan Jick-chi%#, Under Secretary for Home Affairs
Joseph Chan Ho-lim#, Under Secretary for Financial Services and the Treasury
David Chung Wai-keung#, Under Secretary for Innovation and Technology
Clement Woo Kin-man#, Under Secretary for Constitutional and Mainland Affairs

Kathy Siu Ka-yi#, Political Assistant to the Chief Secretary for Administration
Allen Fung Ying-lun*, Political Assistant to Secretary for Development
Jeff Sze Chun-fai#, Political Assistant to Secretary for Education
Lillian Cheong Man-lei%#, Political Assistant to Secretary for Innovation & Technology

Other officials
Vincent Fung Hao-yin%#, Deputy Head of the Policy Innovation and Co-ordination Office
Burmie Wong Wing-kwan, Media Officer at the Home Affairs Bureau

Members of the Legislative Council

 Rock Chen*
 Duncan Chiu*
 Benson Luk*
 Wendy Hong*
 Tan Yueheng~^
 Lai Tung-kwok~^
 Junius Ho~^

 Kenneth Fok~^
 Nixie Lam~^
 Judy Chan%^
 Lillian Kwok^
 Chan Pui-leung^
 Elizabeth Quat^
 Eunice Yung^

 Chow Man-kong^
 Kwok Wai-keung^
 Dennis Lam^
 Kenneth Leung Yuk-wai^
 Johnny Ng^
 Nelson Lam^

Others
Yang Wang, vice-president of Hong Kong University of Science and Technology (HKUST)
Charles Ng Wang-wai, Election Committee constituency candidate at the 2021 Legislative Council election and a vice-president of HKUST (Guangzhou)
Chan Chak-ming, President of the Law Society of Hong Kong
Cally Kwong@, a delegate of Hong Kong to the National People's Congress
Ellen Tsang Fung-chu, member of the Election Committee
Hermes Tang, former Commissioner of Customs and Excise
Wu Chili, manager of a research center under the HKUST Fok Ying Tung Research Institute, and 2021 Legislative Council candidate

Reactions 
Just days before the party, Carrie Lam condemned Cathay Pacific leaders after its staff were blamed for starting the fifth wave of pandemic, and asked them to take the responsibility, citing herself as an example; "I need to be responsible for everything as the head of the Special Administrative Region". However, after ministers were involved in the partygate, Lam said she doesn't need to bear responsibility for ministers' own mistakes. This perceived double standard attracted criticism from the public. Pro-Beijing politicians Tam Yiu-chung and Kwok Wai-keung continued to criticise Cathay Pacific when asked about the event.

In response to the backlash from politicians, local media and attendees to his party who were being moved into quarantine, Hung apologised for his actions from the quarantine centre in Penny's Bay. When asked if he would resign, he told South China Morning Post "I am too busy and don't have time to think about whether I should resign from the Qianhai Authority". Tam Yiu-chung, Hong Kong's delegate to the Standing Committee of the National People's Congress, said that "Hung has said sorry for triggering the saga. I don't see any need for him to resign as a deputy to the NPC".

Senior officials, especially Commissioner of ICAC Simon Peh, were also criticised for attending private parties, which were usually avoided to show neutrality in the colonial era and the early years after the handover of Hong Kong. Chung Kim-wah, vice-president of Hong Kong Public Opinion Research Institute, said the Witman Hung partygate and the Evergrande dinner scandal, in which three officials joined a dinner violating pandemic regulations with one of the attendees was arrested for rape, showed the boundary between the political culture in Hong Kong and in China was further blurred.

On 11 January, Raymond Young, former Permanent Secretary for Home Affairs who was said to be dissatisfied with Carrie Lam when the two worked together, questioned which rules officials broke considering the party was held two days before rules were tightened. He also revealed that Lam attended a wedding recently. Lam replied she attended the wedding party for around 10 minutes and it was in late-November or early-December 2021. Independent Media later reported the party was on 5 December 2021 and Lam had worn a mask during it.

Authorities in Beijing reportedly pressured Lam to take action against the officials implicated. The scandal also attracted international media attention.

Aftermath 

Reportedly facing the sack, Tsui resigned on 31 January, awaiting approval from the Chinese Government. At a press conference a few hours later, Lam criticised all officials who attended but singled out Tsui given his role in overseeing Hong Kong's pandemic response. The investigation report concluded Tsui had breached COVID rules for not scanning the LeaveHomeSafe tracing app and not wearing a mask during conversation at the party.

Two other officials, Vincent Fung and Allen Fung, were verbally warned, whilst the remaining 12 were not punished.

In September 2022, one of the guests, Celia Wong Sze-nga, was charged with submitting false information to health officers.

In November 2022, Tsui said that he contacted Hung and told him that Hung was "also a victim in some way".

See also

 Partygate, a similar political scandal in the United Kingdom
 Oireachtas Golf Society scandal, a similar political scandal in Ireland
 COVID-19 pandemic in Hong Kong
 Political impact of the COVID-19 pandemic

References 

COVID-19 pandemic in Hong Kong
Impact of the COVID-19 pandemic on politics
2022 controversies
Political scandals in Hong Kong
2022 in Hong Kong